Tomáš Grulich (14 January 1951 – 7 August 2020) was a Czech politician who served as a Senator from 2002 to 2018.

References

1951 births
2020 deaths
Czech politicians
Members of the Senate of the Czech Republic
Politicians from Prague
Charles University alumni
Civic Democratic Party (Czech Republic) Senators